The 1989 European Junior Badminton Championships was the 11th tournament of the European Junior Badminton Championships. It was held in Manchester, England, from 26 March to 1st of April. Danish players won all the individual titles and mixed team championships as well.

Medalists

Results

Semi-finals

Finals

Medal table

References 

European Junior Badminton Championships
European Junior Badminton Championships
European Junior Badminton Championships
European Junior Badminton Championships
International sports competitions hosted by England